The EF 300mm lens refers to a family of telephoto prime lenses made by Canon, five of which have been sold to the general public and one of which was only made on special order. The lenses have an EF type mount which fits the Canon EOS line of cameras.

When used on a digital EOS body with a field of view compensation factor of 1.3x, such as the Canon EOS-1D Mark IV, it provides a narrow field of view, equivalent to a 390 mm lens mounted on a 35mm frame body. With a 1.6x body such as the Canon EOS 650D, it provides a narrower field of view, equivalent to a 480 mm lens mounted on a 35mm frame body.

This lens is most commonly used by sports and wildlife photographers, but is short enough to be use for extreme close-up portraits. Because of its rather high native magnification, it can be used for some macro type photography.

Technical information
The EF 300mm is a L series lens. This lens is constructed with a metal body and mount, and with plastic extremities and switches. Features of this lens are: a wide rubber focus ring that is dampened, a distance window, the ability to limit the focus range, and an image stabilizer (on the IS versions). The maximum aperture of 2.8 or 4 gives this lens the ability to create shallow depth of field effects, while the eight- or nine-blade diaphragm produces smooth background blur. The optical construction of this lens contains 15 lens elements, including two UD (Ultra low dispersion) lens elements for the f4 IS USM (for other configurations see chart). This lens uses an inner focusing system, powered by a ring type USM motor. The front of the lens does not rotate nor extend when focusing. This lens is compatible with the Canon Extender EF teleconverters.

Specifications

The 300mm f/1.8 
In addition to the above lenses, Canon made an even faster lens, the EF PE 300mm 1.8, specifically for photo finishes in horse races. According to one racing photographer, Canon made only four of these lenses, making it even less common than the famously rare EF 1200mm lens. Not only is this lens exceptionally rare, very little information about it is available online; the company's online Canon Camera Museum does not list this lens.

References

External links

Canon EF lenses